Ryzhkovo is a rural locality (a village) in Tolpukhovskoye Rural Settlement, Sobinsky District, Vladimir Oblast, Russia. The population was 24 as of 2010. There are 9 streets.

Geography 
Ryzhkovo is located 24 km north of Sobinka (the district's administrative centre) by road. Tolpukhovo is the nearest rural locality.

References 

Rural localities in Sobinsky District